Diana Swain is the executive producer of CBC's investigative documentary program The Fifth Estate. She has held various roles at the public broadcaster, including most recently as the senior editor of the network Investigative Unit. Before that she was senior investigative correspondent and host of The Investigators with Diana Swain on CBC News Network.

Early life and career

Swain was born in Thompson, Manitoba. Her parents separated when she was young and she moved with her mother and younger sister to Chilliwack, British Columbia where she graduated from high school in 1983. In 1984 she represented Chilliwack in the Miss Canada pageant. She worked for a weekly magazine in Chilliwack for ten months and as a reporter at both the Chilliwack Progress and the radio station CHWK , before moving on to a radio station in Kamloops, British Columbia and then a radio station newsroom in Prince George, British Columbia. She began reading the news for CKPG-TV in Prince George in 1986.

Winnipeg

Swain first entered Winnipeg television as co-anchor of the evening newscast on independent station CKND in 1988. Notably, she co-anchored the newscast with her father Brian Swain.

Swain joined CBC's Winnipeg station CBWT in 1990. She started as a reporter for the local news program 24 Hours and quickly became a national reporter. She covered Manitoba and Saskatchewan for The National before becoming anchor of 24 Hours. In 1997, she achieved national notice for her coverage of devastating floods in southern Manitoba. In 2000, Swain's work on 24 Hours was recognized when she won the first of three Gemini Awards for Best News Anchor. By winning the most prestigious award in Canadian television, she broke a streak that saw CBC's The National anchor Peter Mansbridge and CTV's national news anchor Lloyd Robertson swap the trophy back and forth for many years.

In 2000, she anchored the Winnipeg portion of CBC's Canada Now before leaving for the investigative program Disclosure.

Toronto

Initially, Swain commuted to Toronto from Winnipeg while working on Disclosure, but in 2003, she and her family moved to Oakville, Ontario. A year later, "Disclosure" was cancelled, and Swain became the host of CBC News Toronto. Since then, she frequently substituted for Peter Mansbridge as anchor of CBC's flagship news show, The National.

On August 6, 2010, she stepped down as anchor of CBC News Toronto to move to the CBC News Investigative unit, where she became Senior Investigative Correspondent and makes frequent reports on The National. In 2014, she became an anchor on CBC News Network. In 2016, she began hosting a new program, The Investigators with Diana Swain which looks at the work of investigative journalists and the challenges and ethical questions they face  in their work. She also reports on CBC Radio and can be seen on cbcnews.ca.

Swain was given the alumni of the year award from her alma mater BCIT in 2006, recognizing her achievements in the news industry. She received an honorary degree from Humber College in June, 2010.

In 2017, she received an honorary Doctorate in Technology from BCIT and gave the convocation speech 30 years after her own graduation from the school's journalism program.

References

External links

video on Kidsnowcanada.org
profile on CBC Media Centre

1965 births
Canadian television news anchors
Canadian Screen Award winning journalists
Living people
People from Thompson, Manitoba
CBC Television people
British Columbia Institute of Technology alumni
Canadian women television journalists
Journalists from Manitoba
Canadian beauty pageant contestants
20th-century Canadian journalists
21st-century Canadian journalists
20th-century Canadian women